Gathurst is the name given to a small section of the township of Shevington, a Civil Parish within the Metropolitan Borough of Wigan, Greater Manchester, England. It was historically a part of Lancashire. The village is served by a railway station Gathurst railway station which is located on the Manchester-Southport line and managed by Northern. The station also serves the nearby village of Shevington.

Transport 
 Gathurst railway station

See also

Listed buildings in Shevington

References

External links

 Gathurst Railway Station - (photo, circa 1950)

Villages in Greater Manchester
Geography of the Metropolitan Borough of Wigan